This timeline is a selected list of events and locations of the development of the Goldfields-Esperance region of Western Australia.

See also
 Kimberley historical timeline
 Pilbara historical timeline
 Regions of Western Australia

References

Goldfields-Esperance
Western Australian regional timelines